Waltraud Bundschuh (7 March 1928 – 22 July 2014) was a German politician from the Christian Social Union of Bavaria. She was a member of the Landtag of Bavaria from 1962 to 1978.

References

1928 births
2014 deaths
Politicians from Würzburg
Women members of State Parliaments in Germany
Members of the Landtag of Bavaria
Christian Social Union in Bavaria politicians
20th-century German women politicians